A27 or A-27 may refer to:

Roads 
 A27 motorway (Belgium), a road connecting Battice and Sankt Vith at the border with Germany
 A27 road, England, between Wiltshire and East Sussex
 A27 motorway (France), a road connecting A22 and Baisieux
 A 27 motorway (Germany), a road connecting the A 7 at Autobahndreieck Walsrode and Bremen
 A27 road (Isle of Man), a road connecting Colby and Peel
 A27 motorway (Italy), a road connecting Venice and Belluno 
 A27 motorway (Netherlands), a road connecting Breda and Almere
 A27 motorway (Portugal), a road connecting Viana do Castelo and Ponte de Lima 
 A-27 motorway (Spain), a road connecting Tarragona and Lleida
 A 27 road (Sri Lanka), a road connecting Ampara and Mahaoya

Other uses 
 A27 battery, a cylindrical battery of size 8 × 28 mm
Aero A.27, a Czech bomber design of the 1920s
 North American A-27, U.S. designation for 10 BC-1 trainers ordered by Thailand for use as light attackers, but diverted to the Philippines

Archambault A27, a French sailboat design